This article summarizes Japanese football in the 2021 season.

National team results and fixtures

Men's

Senior

U-23

U-20
The 2020 AFC U-19 Championship was cancelled after the draw for the group stage was conducted.

U-17

 Fixtures & Results  – JFA.jp
 2021 schedules – JFA.jp (as of 16 December 2020)

Futsal

Fixtures & Results (Futsal 2021), JFA.jp

U-20 futsal

Beach soccer

Fixtures & Results (Beach soccer 2021)

Women's

Senior

U-20

U-17

Futsal

Club competitions

Men's

Promotion and relegation

J1 League

J2 League

J3 League

Japan Football League

Women's

Promotion and relegation

WE League

Nadeshiko League (Division 1)

Nadeshiko League (Division 2)

Notes

References

 
Seasons in Japanese football